Surachai Jirasirichote (Thai สุรชัย จิระศิริโชติ) is a Thai retired football player. He is a defender who scored 2 goals for the Thailand national team.

He has made several appearances for Thailand in FIFA World Cup qualifying matches.

Managerial statistics

International goals

References 

1970 births
Living people
Surachai Jirasirichote
Surachai Jirasirichote
Surachai Jirasirichote
1996 AFC Asian Cup players
2000 AFC Asian Cup players
Surachai Jirasirichote
Southeast Asian Games medalists in football
Association football defenders
Surachai Jirasirichote
gombak United FC players
geylang International FC players
Surachai Jirasirichote
Competitors at the 1995 Southeast Asian Games
Competitors at the 1997 Southeast Asian Games
Competitors at the 1999 Southeast Asian Games
Surachai Jirasirichote
Footballers at the 1998 Asian Games
Surachai Jirasirichote